The 2011–12 Supersport Series was a first-class cricket competition held in South Africa from 29 September 2011 to 12 February 2012. Titans won their fourth title (including one shared), after defeating Dolphins in the final round of matches. The victory margin in that match of an innings and 325 runs was a record in First-class cricket in South Africa.

Points table

References

External links
 Series home at ESPN Cricinfo

South African domestic cricket competitions
Sunfoil Series
2011–12 South African cricket season
Sunfoil Series